Malingin Island is a small island located in southernmost part of Nueva Valencia, Guimaras in the Philippines, situated beside Unisan Island.

Guimaras Oil Spill

In August 2006, the Guimaras oil spill occurred. The Philippine Coast Guard called this the worst oil spill in the country's history. According to officials,  of mangroves were affected, including parts of the Taklong Island National Marine Reserve.

See also

 List of islands of the Philippines

References

External links
 Malingin Island at OpenStreetMap

Islands of Guimaras